Horowpathana National Park is the 23rd national park in Sri Lanka.

History
In 2005 the Minister for Environment and Natural Resources, A. H. M. Fowzie, instructed the Director-General of the Department of Wildlife Conservation to initiate the creation of a new national park recognising the rich biodiversity in the area. The forest has been identified as receiving the highest rainfall in the Anuradhapura District. It is the natural habitat of leopards, elephants (with officials estimating that at the time there were approximately 400 wild elephants in the forest), samba deer, sloth bears, rabbits and mouse-deer. The Minister believed that declaring the forest as a national park would assist in minimising human-elephant conflict in the area, would protect villagers' cultivations and eliminate poaching and unauthorised timber logging.
 
The creation of the park was formally ratified by gazette notification No 1735/21 on 6 December 2011. Its eastern border starts from Kapugollewahoropothana Road which lies south of Palugaswewa. The southern border of the park starts at Kebbetigollewa Horowpothana on the A 29 road while its western border is located next to the Welimuwapothanna Wewa.

In 2015 the country's first Elephant Holding Ground (EHG) was established in the national park, where problem elephants from around the country are translocated to. The EHG comprises  of land within the national park with the capacity for 40 elephants. The translocation process and the management of the EHG has been criticised by a number of sources.

On 12 September 2019, the park was increased to include the land area adjacent to the Elephant Retention Centre in Horowpothana.

Etymology
Horowpathana comes from the Sinhalese words for ‘sluice’ and ‘seven’, which refers to the area’s ancient irrigation system.

References

2011 establishments in Sri Lanka
National parks of Sri Lanka
Protected areas established in 2011
Protected areas in North Central Province, Sri Lanka
Sri Lanka dry-zone dry evergreen forests